Charles Levin may refer to:

Charles Levin (actor) (1949–2019), American actor
Charles Levin (judge) (1926–2020), former Michigan jurist

See also 
 Charles Levi, bassist
 Charles A. Levine (1897–1991), first passenger aboard a transatlantic flight